Bogdan Volkov is an operatic tenor. Volkov is the winner of the second-place prize at Plácido Domingo's Operalia, The World Opera Competition in Guadalajara, Mexico in 2016 and came in first place at the Paris Opera Competition in 2015.

Bogdan Volkov is one of today's most sought-after young lyric tenors of his generation, acclaimed on stages of the world’s major opera houses as the Teatro alla Scala in Milan, Royal Opera House in London, Metropolitan Opera in New York and Vienna State Opera.
 
Highlights in recent years include The Tale of Tsar Saltan at La Monnaie in Brussels and Eugene Onegin at the Vienna State Opera, both directed by Dmitri Tcherniakov, and Cosi fan tutte at the 100th Salzburg Festival, directed by Christof Loy. With the role of Ferrando Bogdan made his Teatro alla Scala debut in 2021 and later also at the Royal Opera House.
 
Other exciting debuts during the 2021/22 season included Nemorino in L’elisir d’amore at Bavarian State Opera and Alfredo in La traviata at the Dutch National Opera in Amsterdam.
 
The 22/23 season sees Bogdan performing in L’elisir d’amore at the Staatsoper Unter den Linden in Berlin and at the Vienna State Opera, as Chevalier de la Force in Le dialogues des Carmélites at Teatro dell’Opera di Roma and as Lensky in Eugene Onegin at Bavarian State Opera and La Monnaie. He can also be heard at the Metropolitan Opera and the Salzburg Festival as Fenton in Falstaff, and at the Opéra national du Rhin in Thcherniakov’s production of The Tale of Tsar Saltan. 
On the concert platform, he will perform Britten’s Les Illuminations with the Liszt Chamber Orchestra in Budapest, Mozart’s Requiem at the Felsenreitschule in Salzburg, as well as a solo recital in Mulhouse.
 
Bogdan made his first US appearance at the Metropolitan Opera in 2018 as Tybalt in Roméo et Juliette and appeared as Don Ottavio in Don Giovanni at Palm Beach Opera and Tamino in The Magic Flute at the Los Angeles Opera.
 
He studied at R. Glier Kyiv Institute of Music and graduated from Ukrainian National Tchaikovsky Academy of Music. He went on to be a member of the Young Artists Program of the Bolshoi Theatre, and later joined their Ensemble, performing a vaste repertory of different roles. Since 2022, Bogdan has been a member of Berlin State Opera where he made his house debut in 2019 in Betrothal in a Monastery, under the baton of Maestro Daniel Barenboim.
 
Among the awards Bogdan has received are the First Prize and Audience Prize at the Paris Opera Competition in 2015, and Second Prize at Plácido Domingo’s Operalia Competition in 2016.

References

External links 

 https://www.bogdanvolkov.com/
 https://www.salzburgerfestspiele.at/en/a/bogdan-volkov

Year of birth missing (living people)
Living people
Ukrainian operatic tenors
21st-century Ukrainian male opera singers